Suliko Jgenti (1920–2000), credited also as Suliko Zhgenti, was a famous Georgian playwright and filmmaker. His movie Father of a Soldier became one of the popular movies in the former USSR. The movie tells the tragic story of a father who is searching for his son - a Soviet soldier during World War II.

Filmography 

 1961 —   - Bonfires Burn
 1962 —   - Ball and Field
 1964 —   - Father of a Soldier
 1969 —   - What a Youth!
 1969 —   - Light in Our Windows
 1971 —   - Warm in Your Hands
 1972 —   - Young Plants
 1973 —   - Siberian Grandfather
 1977 —   - Racha, My Love
 1978 —   - My Friend Uncle Vanya
 1980 —   - Your Son, Earth
 1986 —   - So Close to the Moon
 1987 —   - Roots
 1987 —   - Gangster at the Beach
 1988 —   - The Lives of Don Quixote and Sancho

External links 
 Internet Movie database

1920 births
2000 deaths
Burials at Didube Pantheon
Soviet dramatists and playwrights